Maurice Dean Wint is a British-born Canadian actor who has starred in several films and television shows.

Life and career
Wint was born in Leicestershire, England, and moved to Canada in 1967 with his family. He began to act in Toronto on stage.

One of his most famous roles is Quentin in the cult favorite science fiction horror film Cube. His other notable roles were in Hedwig and the Angry Inch, RoboCop: Prime Directives, Psi Factor and the TekWar films and television series.

He was married to the actress Colette Stevenson.

He was a Canadian Screen Award nominee for Best Lead Performance in a Web Program or Series at the 10th Canadian Screen Awards in 2022 for the web series For the Record.

Filmography

Film

Television

Captain Power and the Soldiers of the Future (1987–1988) as Sgt. Robert 'Scout' Baker (22 episodes)
Friday the 13th: The Series (1987–1990) as Gil (1 episode)
Street Legal (1991) as Joe Minor (2 episodes)
TekWar (1994–1996) as Lt Winger (9 episodes)
PSI Factor: Chronicles of the Paranormal (1996–1999) as Dr. Curtis Rollins (12 episodes)
Freaky Stories (1997) as Narrator - voice (1 episode)
Earth: Final Conflict (1998) as Capt. Lucas Johnson (2 episodes)
The Outer Limits (1998–1999) as Capt. Roger Kimbro / Jesha  (2 episodes)
Traders (1998–1999) as Fatty Size (4 episodes)
Twice in a Lifetime (1999) as Dr. Sam Heistings, M.D. (1 episode)
Power Stone (1999) as Pride Falcon / Gunrock - voice (8 episodes)
Twitch City (2000) as Taylor (1 episode)
The Zack Files (2001) as Lucky the Talisman - voice (1 episode)
Blue Murder (2001–2002) as Cpl. Nathaniel Sweet/Sgt. Derek Tait (14 episodes)
Tom Stone (2003) as Maj. Lakewood (1 episode)
Moville Mysteries (2003) as Blind Louie - voice (1 episode)
King (2003-2004) as Hugh the Yu-Yu - voice (3 episodes)
Delilah & Julius (2005) as Dynimo / Agent Robinson - voice (2 episodes) 
ReGenesis (2004–2006) as Connor McGuinn (4 episodes)
Sons of Butcher (2006) as Father Fish - voice (1 episode)
Bruno & the Banana Bunch (2006) as Narrator - voice 
The Border (2009) as Leonard Drake (1 episode)
Murdoch Mysteries (2009) as John Warton (1 episode)
Bloodletting & Miraculous Cures (2010) as Anatomy Lab Professor (1 episode)
Spliced (2010) as Narrator / Dreamworm - voice (2 episode)
Haven (2010–2012; 2015) as Agent Byron Howard (8 episodes)
Razzberry Jazzberry Jam (2008–2011) as RC the Double Bass - voice (7 episodes)
The Listener (2011) as Officer Dewhurst (1 episode)
Heartland (2011) as Martin (1 episode)
Flashpoint (2012) as Detective Rene Meyer (1 episode)
Transporter: The Series (2014) as Wilson (1 episode) 
Shoot the Messenger (2016) as Phil Hardcastle (8 episodes)
Suits (2017) as Rick Dunn (1 episode)
Murdoch Mysteries (2017) as Raymond Hatch (1 episode)
Trailer Park Boys: The Animated Series (2019) as Teddy - voice (1 episode)
Diggstown (2019-2020) as Austin Diggs (6 episodes)
SurrealEstate (2021–) as August Ripley

Video games

References

External links 
 
 Maurice Dean Wint on Instagram
 Maurice Dean Wint on Twitter
 Maurice Dean Wint on VIMEO
 Northern Stars biography

English people of Jamaican descent
Black British male actors
English male film actors
English male stage actors
English male television actors
English male voice actors
English expatriates in Canada
Living people
Canadian male film actors
Canadian male television actors
Canadian male voice actors
Black Canadian male actors
Male actors from Toronto
Canadian people of Jamaican descent
Year of birth missing (living people)